George Hunter (13 October 1928 – 17 August 2009) was an Australian rugby league footballer who played in the 1940 and 1950s who also coached the Manly-Warringah Sea Eagles first grade team. Hunter played in two New South Wales Rugby League first grade Grand finals as well as coaching Manly-Warringah to a Grand final in 1968.

Club career
George Hunter began his rugby league career playing as a junior player with the Abermain Reds Rugby League club.  In 1945, he began his senior career with the Kurri Kurri Bulldogs. He then joined Manly in 1949.

George Hunter's played 8 seasons with Manly between 1949 and 1958, and captained the club on numerous occasions during this period. His career took him to two grand finals with Manly-Warringah in 1951 and 1957, although he missed the 1959 grand final due to injury.  In 1959, he announced his retirement due to injuries suffered that year, but in 1960, North Sydney enticed him out of retirement for one last season.

Representative career
Hunter represented NSW Country v City in 1948. He represented for New South Wales v Queensland in 1954 scoring a try in their 18-13 victory. Hunter also played in a Possibles v Probables Kangaroo Tour selection game.

Coaching career 
Hunter was captain-coach of Warialda Premiership winning team in 1950, and of Jindabyne in 1953.

After retiring from playing, he went on to coach Manly-Warringah Sea Eagles third-grade team from 1965 to 1967 and then their first-grade team in 1968 and 1969, including their appearance in the 1968 Grand Final loss to South Sydney. His coaching statistics in those two years at Manly show an impressive 31 wins from 48 games.

Footnotes

Published sources
 Smith, Robert. The Sea Eagle has Landed
 Whiticker, Alan and Hudson, Glen. The Encyclopedia of Rugby League Players
 Apter, Jeff The Coaches : The Men Who Changed Rugby League (2014), The Five Mile Press Scoresby, Victoria

1928 births
2009 deaths
Australian rugby league coaches
Australian rugby league players
Country New South Wales rugby league team players
Date of birth missing
Date of death missing
Kurri Kurri Bulldogs players
Manly Warringah Sea Eagles captains
Manly Warringah Sea Eagles coaches
Manly Warringah Sea Eagles players
New South Wales rugby league team players
North Sydney Bears players
People from the Hunter Region